Escheat  is a common law doctrine that transfers the real property of a person who has died without heirs to the crown or state. It serves to ensure that property is not left in "limbo" without recognized ownership.  It originally applied to a number of situations where a legal interest in land was destroyed by operation of law, so that the ownership of the land reverted to the immediately superior feudal lord.

Etymology
The term "escheat" derives ultimately from the Latin ex-cadere, to "fall-out", via mediaeval French escheoir. The sense is of a feudal estate in land falling-out of the possession by a tenant into the possession of the lord.

Origins in feudalism
In feudal England, escheat  referred to the situation where the tenant of a fee (or "fief") died without an heir or committed a felony. In the case of such demise of a tenant-in-chief, the fee reverted to the King's demesne permanently, when it became once again a mere tenantless plot of land,  but could be re-created as a fee by enfeoffment to another of the king's followers. From the time of Henry III, the monarchy took particular interest in escheat as a source of revenue.

Background
At the Norman Conquest of England in 1066, all the land of England was claimed as the personal possession of William the Conqueror under allodial title. The monarch thus became the sole "owner" of all the land in the kingdom, a position which persists to the present day. He then granted it out to his favoured followers, who thereby became tenants-in-chief, under various contracts of feudal land tenure. Such tenures, even the highest one of "feudal barony", never conferred ownership of land but merely ownership of rights over it, that is to say ownership of an estate in land. Such persons are therefore correctly termed "land-holders" or "tenants" (from Latin teneo to hold), not owners. If held freely, that is to say by freehold, such holdings were heritable by the holder's legal heir. On the payment  of a premium termed feudal relief to the treasury, such heir was entitled to demand re-enfeoffment by the king with the fee concerned.

Where no legal heir existed, the logic of the situation was  that the fief had ceased to exist as a legal entity, since being tenantless no one was living who had been enfeoffed with the land, and the land was thus technically owned by either the crown or the immediate overlord (where the fee had been subinfeudated by the tenant-in-chief to a mesne lord, and perhaps the process of subinfeudation had been continued by a lower series of mesne-lords) as ultimus haeres. Logically therefore it was in the occupation of the crown alone, that is to say in the royal demesne. This was the basic operation of an escheat ('excadere'), a failure of heirs.

Escheat could also take place if a tenant was outlawed or convicted of a felony, when the King could exercise the ancient right of wasting the criminal's land for a year and a day, after which the land would revert to the overlord. (However, one guilty of treason (rather than mere felony) forfeited all lands to the King. John and his heirs frequently insisted on seizing as terrae Normannorum (i.e. "lands of the Normans") the English lands of those lords with holdings in Normandy who preferred to be Normans rather than Englishmen, when the victories of Philip II of France forced them to make a proclamation of allegiance to France.)  Since disavowal of a feudal bond was a felony, lords could escheat land from those who refused to perform their feudal services.  On the other hand, there were also tenants who were merely sluggish in performing their duties, while not being outright rebellious against the lord.  Remedies in the courts against this sort of thing, even in Bracton's day, were available, but were considered laborious and were frequently ineffectual in compelling the desired performance.  The commonest mechanism was distraint, also known as distress (districtio), whereby the lord would seize chattels or goods belonging to the tenant, to hold until performance was achieved.  This practice had been addressed in the 1267 Statute of Marlborough.  Even so, it remained the most common extrajudicial method applied by overlords at the time of Quia Emptores.

Thus, under English common law, there were two main ways an escheat could happen:
 A person's lands escheated to the immediate overlord if he was convicted of a felony (but not treason, in that event the land was forfeited to the Crown).  If the person was executed for felony, his heirs were attainted, i.e. were ineligible to inherit. In most common-law jurisdictions, this type of escheat has been abolished outright, for example in the United States under Article 3 § 3 of the United States Constitution, which states that attainders for treason do not give rise to posthumous forfeiture, or "corruption of blood".
 If a person had no heir to receive his lands under his Will, or under the laws of intestacy, then any land he owned at death would escheat. This rule has been replaced in most common-law jurisdictions by bona vacantia or a similar concept.

Procedure
From the 12th century onward, the Crown appointed escheators to manage escheats and report to the Exchequer, with one escheator per county established by the middle of the 14th century. Upon  the death of a tenant-in-chief, the escheator would be instructed by a writ of diem clausit extremum ("he has closed his last day", i.e. he is dead) issued by the king's chancery, to empanel a jury to hold an "inquisition post mortem" to ascertain who the legal heir was, if any, and what was the extent of the land held. Thus it would be revealed whether the king had any rights to the land. It was also important for the king to know who the heir was, and to assess his personal qualities, since he would thenceforth form a constituent part of the royal army, if he held under military tenure. If there was any doubt, the escheator would seize the land and refer the case to the king's  court where it would be settled, ensuring that not one day's revenue would be lost. This would be a source of concern with land-holders when there were delays from the court.

Current operation

Most common-law jurisdictions have abolished the concept of feudal land tenure of property, and so the concept of escheat has lost something of its meaning. In England and Wales, the possibility of escheat of a deceased person's property to the feudal overlord was abolished by the Administration of Estates Act 1925; however, the concept of Bona vacantia means that the crown (or Duchy of Cornwall or Duchy of Lancaster) can still receive such property if no-one else can be found who is eligible to inherit it.

The term is often now applied to the transfer of the title to a person's property to the state when the person dies intestate without any other person capable of taking the property as heir. For example, a common-law jurisdiction's intestacy statute might provide that when someone dies without a will, and is not survived by a spouse, descendants, parents, grandparents, descendants of parents, children or grandchildren of grandparents, or great-grandchildren of grandparents, then the person's estate will escheat to the state.

Similarly, under Napoleonic law, if someone dies intestate without natural heirs then, after all creditors are paid, any remaining real and personal goods are inherited by the State.

In some jurisdictions, escheat can also occur when an entity, typically a bank, credit union or other financial institution, holds money or property which appears to be  unclaimed, for instance due to a lack of activity on the account by way of deposits, withdrawals or any other transactions for a lengthy time in a cash account.  In many jurisdictions, if the owner cannot be located, such property can be revocably escheated to the state.

In commerce, it is the process of reassigning legal title in unclaimed or abandoned payroll checks, insurance payouts, or stocks and shares whose owners cannot be traced, to a state authority (in the United States). A company is required to file unclaimed property reports with its state annually and, in some jurisdictions, to make a good-faith effort to find the owners of their dormant accounts.  The escheating criteria are set by individual state regulations.

England and Wales

Bankruptcies and liquidations
Escheat can still occur in England and Wales, if a person is made bankrupt or a corporation is liquidated. Usually this means that all the property held by that person is 'vested in' (transferred to) the Official Receiver or Trustee in Bankruptcy. However, it is open to the Receiver or Trustee to refuse to accept that property by disclaiming it. It is relatively common for a trustee in bankruptcy to disclaim freehold property which may give rise to a liability, for example the common parts of a block of flats owned by the bankrupt would ordinarily pass to the trustee to be realised in order to pay his debts, but the property may give the landlord an obligation to spend money for the benefit of lessees of the flats. The bankruptcy of the original owner means that the freehold is no longer the bankrupt's legal property, and the disclaimer destroys the freehold estate, so that the land ceases to be owned by anyone and effectively escheats to become land held by the Crown in demesne.  This situation affects a few hundred properties each year.

Although such escheated property is owned by the Crown, it is not part of the Crown Estate, unless the Crown (through the Crown Estate Commissioners) 'completes' the escheat, by taking steps to exert rights as owner. However, usually, in the example given above, the tenants of the flats, or their mortgagees would exercise their rights given by the Insolvency Act 1986 to have the freehold property transferred to them. This is the main difference between escheat and bona vacantia, as in the latter, a grant takes place automatically, with no need to 'complete' the transaction.

Registration of Crown land
One consequence of the Land Registration Act 1925 was that only estates in land (freehold or leasehold) could be registered. Land held directly by the Crown, known as property in the "royal demesne", is not held under any vestigial feudal tenure (the crown has no historical overlord other than, for brief periods, the papacy) and there is therefore no estate to register. This had the consequence that freeholds which escheated to the Crown ceased to be registrable. This created a slow drain of property out of registration, amounting to some hundreds of freehold titles in each year.

The problem was noted by the Law Commission in their report "Land Registration for the Twenty-First Century". The Land Registration Act 2002 was passed in response to that report. It provides that land held in demesne by the Crown may be registered.

United States

Transfer agents and escheatment 
Escheatment is the process of returning lost or unclaimed property to the government of a State, for safekeeping until the owner(s) is identified. Geographic jurisdiction of the State is determined by the last known address of the original owner. Each of the United States has laws regulating escheatment, with holding periods typically ranging around five years. The legal principle behind escheatment is that all property has a legally recognized owner. Therefore, if the original owner cannot be found within a specified time, the government is presumed to be the owner.

Escheats are performed on a revocable basis. Thus, if property has escheated to a State but the original owner subsequently is found, escheatment is revoked and ownership of the property reverts to that original owner.

Lost shareholders 
According to SEC Rule 17 CFR 240.17f-1: Transfer Agents are obligated by the SEC to report to Commission (specifically to its designee; the SEC's Securities Information System) anytime a certificate is known to be lost or missing for at least 2 days. Transfer Agents must search for the holder's SSN or EIN utilizing an information database system, or if not available, exercise their best effort to match the holder's name and address through these systems. All Transfer Agents must report all lost or missing certificates/shareholders on their own annual filings.

See also 
 Bona vacantia
 Breakage
 Doctrine of lapse
 History of the English fiscal system
 Intestacy
 Quia Emptores

Sources
S.T. Gibson, "The Escheatries, 1327–1341", English Historical Review, 36(1921).
John Bean, The Decline of English Feudalism, 1215–1540, 1968.

References

Common law
Feudalism in England
Property law
Real property law
Time in government